Mandevilla equatorialis is a species of plant in the family Apocynaceae. It is endemic to Ecuador.  Its natural habitat is subtropical or tropical moist montane forests.

References

equatorialis
Endemic flora of Ecuador
Endangered flora of South America
Taxonomy articles created by Polbot